In mathematics, especially in commutative algebra, certain prime ideals called minimal prime ideals play an important role in understanding rings and modules.  The notion of height and Krull's principal ideal theorem use minimal primes.

Definition

A prime ideal P is said to be a minimal prime ideal over an ideal I if it is minimal among all prime ideals containing I. (Note: if I is a prime ideal, then I is the only minimal prime over it.) A prime ideal is said to be a minimal prime ideal if it is a minimal prime ideal over the zero ideal.

Examples

 In a commutative artinian ring, every maximal ideal is a minimal prime ideal.
 In an integral domain, the only minimal prime ideal is the zero ideal.
 In the ring Z of integers, the minimal prime ideals over a nonzero principal ideal (n) are the principal ideals (p), where p is a prime divisor of n.  The only minimal prime ideal over the zero ideal is the zero ideal itself.  Similar statements hold for any principal ideal domain.
 If I is a p-primary ideal (for example, a  symbolic power of p), then p is the unique minimal prime ideal over I.
Let  be the set of zero-divisors in A. Then  is in D (since it kills nonzero ) while neither in  nor ; so .

Properties

All rings are assumed to be commutative and unital.

 Every proper ideal I in a ring has at least one minimal prime ideal above it. The proof of this fact uses Zorn's lemma. Any maximal ideal containing I is prime, and such ideals exist, so the set of prime ideals containing I is non-empty. The intersection of a decreasing chain of prime ideals is prime. Therefore, the set of prime ideals containing I has a minimal element, which is a minimal prime over I.
 Emmy Noether showed that in a Noetherian ring, there are only finitely many minimal prime ideals over any given ideal. The fact remains true if "Noetherian" is replaced by the ascending chain conditions on radical ideals.
 The radical  of any proper ideal I coincides with the intersection of the minimal prime ideals over I. This follows from the fact that every prime ideal contains a minimal prime ideal.
 The set of zero divisors of a given ring contains the union of the minimal prime ideals.
 Krull's principal ideal theorem says that, in a Noetherian ring, each minimal prime over a principal ideal has height at most one.
 Each proper ideal I of a Noetherian ring contains a product of the possibly repeated minimal prime ideals over it (Proof:  is the intersection of the minimal prime ideals over I. For some n,  and so I contains .)
 A prime ideal  in a ring R is a unique minimal prime over an ideal I if and only if , and such an I is -primary if  is maximal. This gives a local criterion for a minimal prime: a prime ideal  is a minimal prime over I if and only if  is a -primary ideal. When R is a Noetherian ring,  is a minimal prime over I if and only if  is an Artinian ring (i.e.,  is nilpotent module I). The pre-image of  under  is a primary ideal of  called the -primary component of I.
 When  is Noetherian local, with max. ideal ,  is minimal over  if and only if there exists a number  such that .

Equidimensional ring 

A Noetherian local ring  is said to be equidimensional if for each minimal prime ideal , . For example, a local Noetherian integral domain and a local Cohen–Macaulay ring are equidimensional.

See also equidimensional scheme and quasi-unmixed ring.

See also 
 Extension and contraction of ideals
 Normalization

Notes

References

Further reading
 http://stacks.math.columbia.edu/tag/035E
 http://stacks.math.columbia.edu/tag/035P

Commutative algebra
Prime ideals